Christopher J. Barnes (born June 24, 1965) is an American former child actor.

Career 
Barnes began his professional film career at the age of 10.  He is perhaps best known for his role as the short-tempered shortstop Tanner Boyle in the 1976 feature film The Bad News Bears and its sequel The Bad News Bears in Breaking Training, as well as for appearing in several After School Specials during the late 1970s and early 1980s.

Barnes earned about $3,000 for his five weeks of work on the original Bad News Bears film, of which 25% was set aside in United States Savings Bonds under the terms of the California Child Actor's Bill (known colloquially as the Coogan Law), to ensure that a portion of his earnings would be available to him once he was an adult. The bonds had been misplaced and didn't resurface until 1998, when he was living in Utah and worked at a flower shop.

Filmography

Movies 
 The Bad News Bears (1976) - Tanner Boyle
 The Bad News Bears in Breaking Training (1977) - Tanner Boyle

Television 
 Delvecchio (episode: "Contract for Harry") (1976) - Tommy Wilson
 NBC Special Treat (episode: Big Henry and the Polka Dot Kid) (1976) - Luke Baldwin
 Taxi (episode: "Memories of Cab 804, Part 1") (1978) - Kid
 Mom, the Wolfman and Me (1980) - Andrew
 Aloha Paradise (episode: "Catching Up") (1981) - Danny
 ABC Afterschool Special (episode: The Color of Friendship (1981) - David Bellinger
 Through the Magic Pyramid (1981) - Bobby Tuttle
 CBS Afternoon Playhouse (episode: Revenge of the Nerd) (1983) - Dalton Surewood

References

Bibliography
 Holmstrom, John. The Moving Picture Boy: An International Encyclopaedia from 1895 to 1995. Norwich, Michael Russell, 1996, p. 358.

External links

1965 births
American male child actors
American male television actors
American male film actors
Living people
Missing middle or first names